Stoneage Cameos is a Hoodoo Gurus tribute album by various artists, released by Shock Records in August 2005 Performances on this tribute album were cited at their 2007 ARIA Hall of Fame induction.

The CD was launched at the Meadows Greyhound Race Track in Broadmeadows, Victoria.

Track listing
The track list is as follows:

References

Tribute albums
Compilation albums by Australian artists
2005 albums